François Moucheron (born 23 May 1896, date of death unknown) was a Belgian footballer. He played in four matches for the Belgium national football team from 1919 to 1921.

References

External links
 

1896 births
Year of death missing
Belgian footballers
Belgium international footballers
Place of birth missing
Association footballers not categorized by position